Alger Island, also known as Big Island, is a small island located on Fourth Lake, part of the Fulton Chain of Lakes, within the Adirondack Park in New York State. The island is located in the Town of Webb, in Herkimer County, New York.

Alger Island was called Deer Island in the late 18th century. It was later called Big Island. Alger Island came from the family name of its longtime owners, father and son Mort and Ollie Alger.

Alger Island was purchased by the state of New York on January 16, 1950. Lean-tos were constructed during the 1960s. Today, the island is operated as a state campground, managed by the New York State Department of Environmental Conservation. The island is accessible only by boat.

Legendary ghost stories popular among overnight campers from nearby Adirondack sleep away camps tell of a match factory that burned to the ground causing those working there to have sulfur and “fossy” burnt into their cheeks leading to glow-in-the-dark jaws. The Fossy Jaws tale entertained and frightened youngsters for generations.

References

External links
Alger Island NYS Department of Environmental Conservation Alger Island Campground information

Islands of Herkimer County, New York
Protected areas of Herkimer County, New York
Lake islands of New York (state)
Islands of New York (state)